The Monkey Prince is a superhero appearing in comic books published by DC Comics and is the human son of the mythical Monkey King. The character, who first appeared in DC Festival of Heroes: The Asian Superhero Celebration # 1 (May 2021), was created by writer Gene Luen Yang, artist Bernard Chang and editor Jessica Chen.  Born Marcus Sun, he was  named Marcus Shugel-Shen by his adoptive parents, who are criminal scientists and career henchpeople.  Marcus discovers his divine heritage from his father's comrade Pigsy, who trains him on controlling his powers.  Despite this, the Monkey Prince has a loving relationship with his adoptive parents and despises superheroes.

Publication history 
In April 2021, DC comics announced that a new Asian superhero would be introduced in the commemorative anthology comic DC Festival of Heroes: The Asian Superhero Celebration (May 2021) to celebrate Asian American and Pacific Islander Heritage Month, in a twelve-page story written by Gene Luen Yang and illustrated by Bernard Chang.  The character was conceived during a meeting between Yang, Chang and DC editor Jessica Chen to expand Asian representation within the DC Universe. Being Chinese American, the three had childhood memories of the Monkey King, who Yang noted shared many similarities with  American superheroes. Wanting to create a unique story distinctive from previous depictions of the Monkey King, the new hero would be the son of the Monkey King rather than the Monkey King himself, resulting in the Monkey Prince.  The Monkey Prince was also given a secret human identity to be similar to other DC characters.

While designing the Monkey Prince, Chang created a costume that was inspired by the Monkey King's rebellious "attitude" and incorporated elements of traditional mythological hero and modern superhero designs, which included Chinese armor and sneakers.  The "M" on the Monkey Prince's chest was inspired by the emblems used by Superman and Aquaman, which were also letters from the English Alphabet that also represented a different function; for the Monkey Prince, the "M" was a graphic representation of Flower Fruit Mountain.  

The Monkey Prince later starred in his own self-titled limited series, beginning with the digital only issue #0 in October 2021, with Yang and Chang returning.  The limited series would tie into the 2023 crossover storyline "Lazarus Planet", which featured the Monkey Prince as a central character, written by Yang and Mark Waid.

Character biography

Birth and early life
Following a war between Darkseid and the Heavenly Realm, the Monkey King and his clones created from his hairs fled to the Phantom Zone to recuperate from his injuries.  Unbeknownst to the Monkey King, one his clones refused to revert, instead taking the form of a human infant and gestated inside of a rock in the Phantom Zone, making himself the Monkey King's "son".    Centuries later, Ultra-Humanite opened a portal to the Phantom Zone in Metropolis to enslave the Monkey King, who hurled boulders through the portal, which included the rock containing the infant.  Ultra-Humanite's daughter Laura Shugel and his assistant and Laura's lover Winston Shen rescued the baby and fled as Ultra-Humanite fought the Justice League.  

Laura and Winston married and adopted the baby as their son, whom they named Marcus.  Marcus grew up in a loving household, while remaining completely oblivious to his origin and his parents' criminal backgrounds.  During Marcus' childhood when the Shugel-Shens lived in Gotham City, Batman broke into their home during a thunderstorm to interrogate Winston and Laura but fled when he saw Marcus.  The experience left Marcus with a fear of bats, storms and water and a hatred for superheroes, which would periodically cause him to suffer from panic attacks.  The Shugel-Shens moved frequently due to Winston's and Laura's employment with various supervillains which Marcus continued to remain oblivious to.

Becoming the Monkey Prince  
When Marcus is fifteen, the Shugel-Shens move back to Gotham due to his parents' work.  After Marcus is tormented by several bullies at his high school, the school janitor Mr. Zhu encourages him to face his fears, prompting him to jump into the school swimming pool.  Marcus finds himself transported to Flower Fruit Mountain, where Mr. Zhu tells him that his true father is the Monkey King and reveals himself to be Pigsy, his father's comrade.  Appointing himself as Marcus' shifu, Pigsy warns Marcus of an upcoming threat to Earth and places a circlet on his head, transforming him into the Monkey Prince.  

The Monkey Prince becomes overconfident with his newfound abilities and initially uses his powers for selfish reasons, such as getting revenge on his bullies, but his inexperience and constant phobias interfere with ability to maintain his transformation, forcing Marcus to accept Pigsy as his shifu and to come to terms with his birthright.  

Under Pigsy's tutelage, the Monkey Prince learns to overcome his fears to awaken and control his latent abilities while discovering more about his father's history.   Coincidentally, several of the Shugel-Shens' supervillain employers come across and become possessed by malevolent Chinese demons, forcing the Monkey Prince to repeatedly rescue his parents and defeat their employers by exorcising the demons possessing them.  Due to their bosses getting defeated, the Shugel-Shens repeatedly move to find new employment while Pigsy secretly follows them to continue Marcus' training.  Although Marcus discovers his parents' criminal backgrounds, the Shugel-Shens remain unaware of their son's identity as the Monkey Prince.    

Due to his dislike of superheroes, the Monkey Prince comes into conflict with them during his adventures, including Batman and Robin, Aquaman and Shazam.  At Pigsy's urging, the Monkey Prince cooperates with them to help defeat demons and realizes the true meaning of being a hero.  The Monkey Prince's newfound heroism allows him to claim a duplicate of his father's Ruyi Jingu Bang and even earns him the grudging respect of the second Trench King and his daughter Shellestriah.    

During the Monkey Prince's adventures, the Golden and Silver Horned Kings are released from the gourds the Monkey King previously imprisoned them in, but are foiled by the Monkey Prince and Pigsy with the help of the superheroes the Monkey Prince befriended.  Despite their defeat, the Golden and Silver Horned Kings are able consume some of the qi of Batman and Aquaman, respectively, and are recruited by King Fire Bull as part of his plans to invade Earth.

Lazurus Planet
The Shugel-Shens relocate to Metropolis and are hired as scientists for LexCorp. While Marcus meets with some new friends, Pigsy is captured by his and the Monkey King's old friend-turned enemy Nezha, who is also King Fire Bull's archenemy and adoptive father.  Meanwhile, King Fire Bull and the Horned Kings attack LexCorp to consume several Bizarro clones, which leaves Laura fatally injured.  Unable to take her to a hospital, Winston brings Marcus and the comatose Laura to her estranged father Gerard Shugel, Ultra-Humanite's human form, who nurses her in his secret laboratory outside of Metropolis.  While investigating the attack on LexCorp, Supergirl flies close to Gerard's lair, causing Marcus to think she is after his parents and transforms into his monkey form to confront her.  Gerard mistakenly believes the two are working together and confronts them in his Ultra-Humanite body.  

Concurrently, King Fire Bull causes the volcano on Lazarus Island to erupt, causing several Lazurus-fueled storms to erupt all over Earth, with Lazarus Resin raining over Metropolis causing various effects to people who come into contact with it, including the Monkey Prince.  After dealing with Ultra-Humanite, the Monkey Prince assists Supergirl in quelling the chaos in Metropolis and accompanies her to the abandoned Hall of Justice where Supergirl puts out a call to all available heroes to deal with the current crisis.  Several heroes gather at the Hall, where Robin takes charge of the group and debriefs them on King Fire Bull and the events that transpired on Lazurus Island.  As Robin dispatches the heroes to deal with the various threats affecting the world, he orders the Monkey Prince to remain at the Hall with him and Black Alice due to his lack of experience.  The Monkey Prince befriends Alice and comforts her while she is still traumatized from her previous ordeal with Nezha.  One of Pigsy's miniature clones visits the Monkey Prince and divulges Nezha's and King Fire Bull's origins and their corruption.  Pigsy also informs him of his capture but orders the Monkey Prince not to rescue him and to help the other heroes.  

The Monkey Prince leaves the Hall to give Alice some time alone, but while he is away King Fire Bull attacks Robin and destroys the Hall.  The Monkey Prince returns to find the Hall in ruins and Ultra-Humanite and Winston attempting to open a portal to the Phantom Zone to capture the Monkey King.  Despite Winston being knocked unconscious, Ultra-Humanite succeeds in opening the portal but the Monkey Prince thwarts him by jumping into the Phantom Zone, where he encounters his father.  Sun Wukong does not believe Marcus is his son, even after Marcus displays the same abilities as him and Wukong witnesses a memory from Marcus' birth.  Marcus requests Wukong's help against Nezha and King Fire Bull but he refuses, as leaving the Phantom Zone will result in his death.  To prove that he is his son, the Monkey King orders the Monkey Prince to deal with Nezha and King Fire Bull and once successful to seek out his mentor, the Sandalwood Buddha, as he could help Wukong escape the Phantom Zone.  As the Monkey Prince returns to Earth, Ultra-Humanite deduces his identity and injects nanobots into his adoptive grandson's body, which will torture him unless he obeys Ultra-Humanite's commands.

The Monkey Prince helps Robin and Alice fight King Fire Bull before more heroes arrive to fight him and witnesses Alice seemingly sacrifice herself to help the heroes defeat and imprison King Fire Bull.  Afterwards, the Monkey Prince reunites with Pigsy in Metropolis where he vows to kill King Fire Bull for what he did to Laura, but Pigsy warns him about seeking revenge, revealing that undisciplined power and hate was what made King Fire Bull become a devil.  When Nezha possesses Batman and captures Robin, the Monkey Prince rescues him and helps Robin, the Bat-Family, Pigsy, Zatanna and Enchantress free Batman from Nezha's spirit in Gotham City.   

While cleaning up Metropolis with Pigsy, Supergirl and Shellestriah, the Monkey Prince defends the city from an army of skeletal soldiers sent by their demoness master to capture Supergirl to replenish the weakened King Fire Bull.  The soldiers reveal that the Monkey Prince is the Monkey King's clone rather than his son, causing the Monkey Prince to have a nervous breakdown, allowing the soldiers to capture Supergirl due to her vulnerability to magic.  While pursuing the soldiers, Pisgy reassures the Monkey Prince that he is indeed the Monkey King's son as no clone could experience or accomplish what he achieved, allowing Marcus to accept himself as real.  The Monkey Prince rescues Supergirl and defeats King Fire Bull, who is resealed back in his prison by Pigsy.  Finally coming to terms with his identity, Marcus reunites with Winston and Laura, who has fully recovered, but now has to contend with Gerard knowing his secret.

Powers and abilities 
Despite being the son of the Monkey King, Marcus Sun possesses little to none of his father's powers or abilities in his human form.  Through the use of a magic circlet provided by Shifu Pigsy,  Marcus says the magic word "biàn" (Chinese: 變; "Transform"), which transforms him into the Monkey Prince, giving him a Simian-like physiology including brown fur and a prehensile tail.  While the circlet is always worn on his head for his transformations, it can appear on any part of Marcus' body-including his chest, waist, wrist and neck-and will always return to him when separated from him.  Pigsy utters the Buddhist chant "amituofo" to tighten the circlet whenever the Monkey Prince needs to be disciplined or restrained.     

The Monkey Prince possesses superhuman strength, durability, agility and reflexes.  Due to his demigod status, the Monkey Prince is immortal, allowing him to survive from fatal injuries that can kill a normal being and possesses a regenerative healing factor to quickly recover from wounds.  The Monkey Prince's demigod status also allows him to breathe underwater and adapt to harsh underwater environments. 

The Monkey Prince can separate his limbs from his body, which he can control telepathically.  Due to his immortality, the Monkey Prince can survive being dismembered and decapitated by his enemies and can use his healing factor to reattach his limbs.  However if the Monkey Prince's body parts are separated when reverting back to human form, he will die.  

The Monkey Prince possesses aerokinesis, or the ability to generate and manipulate forms of air and gas.  The Monkey Prince typically utilizes this to create magical clouds from his breath that can be used in a variety of ways.  These clouds can be used as modes of transportation that he can use for himself and others to fly on, move objects at a distance, or put people to sleep.  The clouds can also be created underwater.

In addition to changing between his human and monkey forms, the Monkey Prince can also shapeshift into any being he chooses.  

Much like his father, the Monkey Prince can create clones of himself from his own hairs.  Originally creating misshapen clones,   exposure to Lazarus Resin allowed him to create perfect but miniature duplicates of himself.  Loose hairs shed from his body are involuntarily transformed into clones.  After some training from his father, the Monkey Prince is able to create fully grown clones of himself.  While the clones cannot replicate his powers, the Monkey Prince can create clones of other beings.      

Due to his training under Pigsy and his simian physiology, the Monkey Prince is proficient in martial arts and acrobatics.  He also possesses a duplicate of his father's legendary Ruyi Jingu Bang, which has the same abilities as the original, including being able to alter its size, be recalled to its owner and exorcise demons and spirits.   

The Monkey Prince's powers are tied to his emotional state; extreme anger or arrogance turns his fur golden colored and sends him in a berserker-like rage while amplifying his powers while fear weakens him and reverts him back to his human form.  Marcus' numerous phobias interfered with his early transformations but his training under Pigsy and adventures as the Monkey Prince helped him overcome his fears.

See also 
 American Born Chinese: a 2006 graphic novel written by the Monkey Prince's co-creator Gene Luen Yang, which also features the Monkey King and his son as major characters.  
 Journey to the West

References 

Comics characters introduced in 2021
Chinese-American superheroes
DC Comics superheroes
DC Comics characters who are shapeshifters
DC Comics characters who can move at superhuman speeds
DC Comics characters with accelerated healing
DC Comics characters with superhuman strength
DC Comics characters who use magic
DC Comics titles
Fictional characters with air or wind abilities
Fictional characters with superhuman durability or invulnerability
Fictional monkeys
Fictional characters who can duplicate themselves
Fictional characters who can move at superhuman speeds
Fictional characters who use magic
Fictional stick-fighters